Pentachlorophenol monooxygenase (pentachlorophenol dechlorinase, pentachlorophenol dehalogenase, pentachlorophenol 4-monooxygenase, PCP hydroxylase, pentachlorophenol hydroxylase, PcpB, PCB 4-monooxygenase, PCB4MO) is an enzyme with systematic name pentachlorophenol,NADPH:oxygen oxidoreductase (hydroxylating, dechlorinating). This enzyme catalyses the following chemical reaction

 (1) pentachlorophenol + 2 NADPH + H+ + O2  2,3,5,6-tetrachlorohydroquinone + 2 NADP+ + chloride + H2O
 (2) 2,3,5,6-tetrachlorophenol + NADPH + H+ + O2  2,3,5,6-tetrachlorohydroquinone + NADP+ + H2O

Pentachlorophenol monooxygenase is a flavoprotein (FAD).

References

External links 
 

EC 1.14.13